The Medal of Honor was created during the American Civil War and is the highest military decoration presented by the United States government to a member of its armed forces. The recipients must have distinguished themselves at the risk of their own life above and beyond the call of duty in action against an enemy of the United States. Due to the nature of this medal, it is commonly presented posthumously.

The Vietnam War, (also known as the Second Indochina War, Vietnam Conflict, and in Vietnam as the American War), took place from 1955 to 1975. The war was fought between the Communist-supported Democratic Republic of Vietnam and the United States-supported Republic of Vietnam, beginning with the presence of a small number of US military advisors in 1955 and escalating into direct US involvement in a ground war in 1965. US combat forces were withdrawn in early 1973 pursuant to the Paris Peace Accords, but the war continued concluding with the Fall of Saigon on 30 April 1975.

During the Vietnam War and in the following twelve months, 235 Medals of Honor were awarded and since 1978 a further 31 awards have been presented. Of the total of 266 awards, 178 were to the US Army, 15 to the US Navy, 58 to the USMC and 14 to the USAF. These totals do not include the award to the Vietnam Unknown Soldier.

The first Medal of Honor presentation for Vietnam was to Captain Roger Donlon for actions on 6 July 1964 as commanding officer of the U.S. Army Special Forces Detachment defending Camp Nam Dong against a Viet Cong attack. The last actions to earn a Medal of Honor in this war were those of Bud Day, for actions as a prisoner of war from 26 August 1967 through 14 March 1973. Day and three others were presented with the Medal of Honor by President Ford at the White House on March 4, 1976. They were the last of the 235 servicemen awarded the Medal of Honor during the Vietnam War and in the following twelve months.

The first African American recipient of the war was Milton L. Olive III who sacrificed himself to save others by smothering a grenade with his body. Riley L. Pitts was killed after attacking an enemy force with rifle fire and grenades and was the first African American commissioned officer of the war to receive the medal. Thomas Bennett and Joseph LaPointe were conscientious objectors who received the medal for their actions as a medic; three chaplains received the medal, including Vincent R. Capodanno, who served with the Marine Corps and was known as the "Grunt Padre".

Recipients

Unknown soldier
The unknown soldier from the Vietnam War who was buried in the Tomb of the Unknowns was authorized a Medal of Honor and in 1998 was identified as 1st Lieutenant Michael Blassie, USAF. After DNA testing confirmed his identity, the remains were removed from the tomb and returned to Blassie's family, but the Medal of Honor did not transfer with him. It remains awarded to "the unknown soldier" as a tribute to the war dead who have not yet been identified. The Blassie family requested that the Medal of Honor be granted to him but the request was denied by the Department of Defense.

See also

 List of Medal of Honor recipients

References

 

Vietnam War